Martinsville Historic District is a national historic district located at Martinsville, Virginia. It encompasses 94 contributing buildings, 1 contributing site, and 3 contributing structures in the central business district of Martinsville.  The buildings range in date from the early-19th century through the mid- 20th century and include notable examples of the Romanesque, Federal, and Colonial Revival styles.  Notable buildings include the Henry County Courthouse (1824), People's Bank (1891), Globman's Department Store (c. 1915), Ford Building (1908), U.S. Post Office (1939), the Masonic Temple, the Henry Hotel (1921), the Martinsville Hotel (c. 1930), First National Bank Building (1925), the Knights of Pythias Building (1922), Oakley Apartment / Office Building (1935), the Chief Tassel Building (1930), First United Methodist Church of Martinsville (1922), Richardson's Motor Co. (c. 1918), Gravely Pin Factory (1907), and Sale Knitting Plant (1937).

It was listed on the National Register of Historic Places in 1998.

References

External links
Henry County Courthouse, 1 East Main Street, Martinsville, Martinsville, VA: 1 photo and 1 photo caption page at Historic American Buildings Survey

Historic American Buildings Survey in Virginia
Historic districts on the National Register of Historic Places in Virginia
Federal architecture in Virginia
Romanesque Revival architecture in Virginia
Colonial Revival architecture in Virginia
Buildings and structures in Martinsville, Virginia
National Register of Historic Places in Martinsville, Virginia